Murillo, previously recorded as Nurillo, is a census-designated place (CDP) in Hidalgo County, Texas, United States. The population was 7,344 at the 2010 census, up from 5,056 at the 2000 census. It is part of the McAllen–Edinburg–Mission Metropolitan Statistical Area.

Geography
Murillo is located in south-central Hidalgo County at  (26.267091, -98.131725). It is bordered to the west by Edinburg, the county seat, to the southwest by Lopezville, to the south by San Juan, and to the north by Cesar Chavez.

Demographics
As of the census of 2000, there were 5,056 people, 1,231 households, and 1,144 families residing in the CDP. The population density was 726.0 people per square mile (280.5/km2). There were 1,329 housing units at an average density of 190.8/sq mi (73.7/km2). The racial makeup of the CDP was 75.95% White, 0.34% African American, 0.32% Native American, 21.02% from other races, and 2.37% from two or more races. Hispanic or Latino of any race were 96.70% of the population.

There were 1,231 households, out of which 64.7% had children under the age of 18 living with them, 72.5% were married couples living together, 15.5% had a female householder with no husband present, and 7.0% were non-families. 5.4% of all households were made up of individuals, and 1.8% had someone living alone who was 65 years of age or older. The average household size was 4.11 and the average family size was 4.24.

In the CDP, the population was spread out, with 39.9% under the age of 18, 12.7% from 18 to 24, 28.2% from 25 to 44, 15.3% from 45 to 64, and 3.9% who were 65 years of age or older. The median age was 24 years. For every 100 females, there were 96.7 males. For every 100 females age 18 and over, there were 93.2 males.

The median income for a household in the CDP was $24,645, and the median income for a family was $25,160. Males had a median income of $18,137 versus $15,284 for females. The per capita income for the CDP was $7,611. About 32.8% of families and 38.2% of the population were below the poverty line, including 43.7% of those under age 18 and 37.6% of those age 65 or over.

Education
Murillo is served by the Edinburg Consolidated Independent School District.

Zoned elementary schools serving sections of Murillo include Betts, Cano-Conzalez, De Escandon, Gorena, Lyndon B. Johnson, and Ramirez (grades PK-5),

Almost all of Murillo is zoned to Barrientes Middle School, with a small segment zoned to South Middle School. All residents are zoned to Edinburg High School (9-12).

In addition, South Texas Independent School District operates magnet schools that serve the community.

All of Hidalgo County is in the service area of South Texas College.

References

Census-designated places in Hidalgo County, Texas
Census-designated places in Texas